The 2017 Israeli Beach Soccer League was a national beach soccer league that took place between 9 June and 21 July 2017, in Netanya, Israel.

Group stage
All kickoff times are of local time in Netanya, Israel (UTC+02:00).

Group A

Group B

Relegation playoffs (Loser on Final is relegated)

Relegation playoffs

Knockout stage

Yahav Friendship Cup

Quarter-finals

Semi-finals

Youth Final

Survival match

Final

Goalscorers

14 goals

 Juan Bazo (Maccabi "RE/MAX" Netanya)

12 goals

 T. Ilos (Ironi "Office Depot" Petah Tikva)
 T. Goto ("Roah Bakfar" Tel Aviv)

10 goals

 Fran (Maccabi "RE/MAX" Netanya)

9 goals

 A. Yatim (Bnei "Falfala" Kfar Qassem)
 O. Halevi (Hapoel "Shaltal" Karmiel)
 N. Revivo ("A. Tahzokat Otobosim" Haifa)
 H. Jabaren (Ihud "Mashtelat" Bnei Sakhnin)

8 goals

 D. da Silva (Bnei "Falfala" Kfar Qassem)
 S. Gormezano (Hapoel "Shaltal" Karmiel)
 I. Bar David (Beitar Jerusalem)
 M. Kirtava (Hapoel "Mol Hahof" Hedera)
 O. Ifrah (Hapoel "Mol Hahof" Hedera)
 B. Shem Tov ("A. Tahzokat Otobosim" Haifa)

7 goals

 D. Halevi (Hapoel "Shaltal" Karmiel)
 A. Frutos ("Schwartz Home" Rosh HaAyin)
 Y. Shina (Beitar Jerusalem)

6 goals

 K. Badash "Schwartz Home" Rosh HaAyin)
 E. Sasportas (Hapoel "Mol Hahof" Hedera)

5 goals

 B. Briga (Maccabi "RE/MAX" Netanya)
 E. Tzabari (Maccabi "RE/MAX" Netanya)
 M. Amer (Bnei "Falfala" Kfar Qassem)
 O. Ilos (Ironi "Office Depot" Petah Tikva)
 Benjamin Jr. ("Schwartz Home" Rosh HaAyin)
 N. Mechani ("Roah Bakfar" Tel Aviv)
 R. Amran (Beitar Jerusalem)
 E. Magol (Bnei Yehuda "Shemesh")
 O. Halwani (Hapoel "AuntieAnnes" Holon)

4 goals

 O. Boaron (Maccabi "RE/MAX" Netanya)
 Dino (Bnei "Falfala" Kfar Qassem)
 A. da Silva (Bnei "Falfala" Kfar Qassem)
 N. Sarsur (Bnei "Falfala" Kfar Qassem)
 D. Maradona (Ironi "Office Depot" Petah Tikva)
 E. Cohen ("Schwartz Home" Rosh HaAyin)
 Dieginio ("Schwartz Home" Rosh HaAyin)
 S. Edri (Hapoel "AuntieAnnes" Holon)
 R. Gershomov (Hapoel "AuntieAnnes" Holon)

3 goals

 Reyder (Maccabi "RE/MAX" Netanya)
 A. Levi (Maccabi "RE/MAX" Netanya)
 A. Danin (Ironi "Office Depot" Petah Tikva)
 Y. Abitbul (Beitar Jerusalem)
 E. Salami (Bnei Yehuda "Shemesh")
 I. Srur ("A. Tahzokat Otobosim" Haifa)
 G. Asulin ("A. Tahzokat Otobosim" Haifa)
 I. Sharon (Hapoel "Mol Hahof" Hedera)

2 goals

 Chiky (Maccabi "RE/MAX" Netanya)
 S. Moreb (Bnei "Falfala" Kfar Qassem)
 A. Sarsur (Bnei "Falfala" Kfar Qassem)
 R. Badir (Bnei "Falfala" Kfar Qassem)
 Madjer (Hapoel "Shaltal" Karmiel)
 V. Ganon (Hapoel "Shaltal" Karmiel)
 T. Azulay (Hapoel "Shaltal" Karmiel)
 Heverton (Ironi "Office Depot" Petah Tikva)
 A. Halifa (Ironi "Office Depot" Petah Tikva)
 A. Ventura (Ironi "Office Depot" Petah Tikva)
 O. Yehezkel ("Roah Bakfar" Tel Aviv)
 E. Ben Menashe ("Roah Bakfar" Tel Aviv)
 N. Cohen (Beitar Jerusalem)
 R. Peretz (Bnei Yehuda "Shemesh")
 A. Cohen (Hapoel "Mol Hahof" Hedera)
 L. Tal ("A. Tahzokat Otobosim" Haifa)
 K. Okashi ("A. Tahzokat Otobosim" Haifa)
 Y. Sabag (Hapoel "AuntieAnnes" Holon)
 Y. Machluf (Hapoel "AuntieAnnes" Holon)
 S. Kophman (Hapoel "AuntieAnnes" Holon)
 M. Badarna (Ihud "Mashtelat" Bnei Sakhnin)
 H. Suan (Ihud "Mashtelat" Bnei Sakhnin)
 M. Awad (Ihud "Mashtelat" Bnei Sakhnin)

Winners

Awards

See also
 Israeli Beach Soccer League

References

External links
 2017 Israeli Beach Soccer League's official draw live on Sport5
 The world's best beach soccer player - Madjer has signed with Hapoel "Shaltal" Karmiel

Youtube highlights
 Round 1's highlights
 Round 2's highlights
 Round 3's highlights
 Israel vs. Netherlands highlights
 Relegation playoffs & Quarter-finals highlights

Israeli Beach Soccer League seasons
National beach soccer leagues
2017 in beach soccer